Segero Creek (also Segera River or Sagero Creek) is a creek located in Western Province, Papua New Guinea.

Segero village, where the Tabo language is spoken, is located on banks of the creek.

See also
List of rivers of Papua New Guinea
Tabo language

References

Rivers of Papua New Guinea